The women's 100 metres competition at the 1976 Summer Olympics in Montreal, Quebec, Canada was held at the Olympic Stadium on 24–25 July.

Competition format
The women's 100m competition consisted of heats (Round 1), Quarterfinals, Semifinals and a Final. The five fastest competitors from each race in the heats plus the next two fastest overall qualified for the Quarterfinals. The four fastest competitors from each of the Quarterfinal races qualified for the Semifinals, where again the four fastest runners from each heat advanced to the final.

Records
Prior to the competition, the existing World and Olympic records were as follows.

Results

Heats
Qual. rule: first 5 of each heat (Q) plus the two fastest times (q) qualified.

Heat 1

Heat 2

Heat 3

Heat 4

Heat 5

Heat 6

Quarterfinals

Quarterfinal 1

Quarterfinal 2

Quarterfinal 3

Quarterfinal 4

Semifinals

Semifinal 1

Semifinal 2

Final

References

External links
 Official Olympic Report , la84foundation.org. Retrieved August 19, 2012.

Athletics at the 1976 Summer Olympics
100 metres at the Olympics
1976 in women's athletics
Women's events at the 1976 Summer Olympics